The Verse of Loan is verse 282 in chapter Al-Baqara (Q2:282). This verse is the longest verse at the longest chapter in Quran. The concept of borrowing was explained in the verse.

Text and meaning

[] 
 O you who have believed, when you contract a debt for a specified term, write it down. 

[] 
And let a scribe write [it] between you in justice. 

[] 
Let no scribe refuse to write as  has taught him. 

[] 
So let him write and let the one who has the obligation [i.e., the debtor] dictate. And let him fear , his Lord, and not leave anything out of it. 

[] 
But if the one who has the obligation is of limited understanding or weak or unable to dictate himself, then let his guardian dictate in justice. 

[] 
And bring to witness two witnesses from among your men. 

[] 
And if there are not two men [available], then a man and two women from those whom you accept as witnesses – so that if one of them [i.e., the women] errs, then the other can remind her. 

[] 
And let not the witnesses refuse when they are called upon. 

[] 
And do not be [too] weary to write it, whether it is small or large, for its [specified] term. 
 
[] 

[] 
except when it is an immediate transaction which  you  conduct  among yourselves. For [then] there is no blame upon you if you do not write it. 

[] 
And take witnesses when you conclude a contract. 

[] 
Let no scribe be harmed or any witness. 

[] 
For if you do so, indeed, it is [grave] disobedience in you. 

[] 
And fear . 
 
[] 
And  teaches you. 

[] 
And Allāh is Knowing of all things.

Meaning
 O you who believe! When you contract a debt for a fixed period, write it down. Let a scribe write it down in justice between you. Let not the scribe refuse to write as Allah has taught him, so let him write. Let him (the debtor) who incurs the liability dictate, and he must fear Allah, his Lord, and diminish not anything of what he owes. But if the debtor is of poor understanding, or weak, or is unable himself to dictate, then let his guardian dictate in justice. And get two witnesses out of your own men. And if there are not two men (available), then a man and two women, such as you agree for witnesses, so that if one of them (two women) errs, the other can remind her. And the witnesses should not refuse when they are called on (for evidence). You should not become weary to write it (your contract), whether it be small or big, for its fixed term, that is more just with Allah; more solid as evidence, and more convenient to prevent doubts among yourselves, save when it is a present trade which you carry out on the spot among yourselves, then there is no sin on you if you do not write it down. But take witnesses whenever you make a commercial contract. Let neither scribe nor witness suffer any harm, but if you do (such harm), it would be wickedness in you. So be afraid of Allah; and Allah teaches you. And Allah is the All-Knower of each and everything.

See also 
 Qard al-Hasan
 Verse of Ikmal al-Din
 Verse of Wilaya
 Warning Verse
 Verse of Brotherhood
 Verse of Purification
 Muhammad in the Quran
 Verse of Evil Eye
 Verse of Obedience
 Verse of Mawadda

References 

Quranic verses
Islamic ethics
Shia Islam
Sunni Islam
Sharia
Al-Baqara